Protestants in Tanzania are mostly consisted of the Anglican Church of Tanzania and of the Evangelical Lutheran Church in Tanzania. There are approximately 13,986,000 Protestants in Tanzania.

References

Protestantism in Tanzania